Tell Bar Elias is an archaeological site 2 km north of the Chtaura to Damascus road in the centre of the village of Bar Elias in the Beqaa Mohafazat (Governorate). It dates at least to the Early Bronze Age.

References

Baalbek District
Bronze Age sites in Lebanon